Peder Elias (born 1997) is a Norwegian singer-songwriter. He debuted in 2018 and released his first album, Love & Loneliness, in 2022.

Discography

Albums 

 Love & Loneliness (2022)

Charted songs

Awards and nominations

References

External links 

 

1997 births
Living people
People from Trondheim
Norwegian singer-songwriters
Norwegian pop singers